The Mount Pleasant Public Schools (MPPS) is a public school district in Mount Pleasant, Michigan.

In 2021, the entire district territory joined the service area and the taxation area of Mid Michigan College as per the results of an election. On May 4, voters passed two ballot proposals that sought approval for both annexation and the college's millage rate. Within the Mt. Pleasant School District, 1,593 and 1,415 voters approved being a part of the service area and taxation area, respectively, while 952 and 1,141 voted against each, respectively.

References

School districts in Michigan
Education in Isabella County, Michigan